"America" is a song by American singer, songwriter, and multi-instrumentalist Sufjan Stevens. It was released as the lead single from the album The Ascension through Asthmatic Kitty on July 3, 2020.

Background and composition
Stevens announced his upcoming eighth studio album, titled The Ascension, as well as its lead single, "America", on June 30, 2020. In his announcement, Stevens declared "America" as a "protest song against the sickness of American culture in particular". The song was first written in 2014 during the time that Stevens was working on his seventh studio album, Carrie & Lowell. It has also been described as a "twelve-minute rumination on disillusionment, suffering, and loss of faith in [Stevens's] nation".

Critical reception
Awarding "America" four stars out of five, NMEs El Hunt deemed it "weighty and substantial". Sam Sodomsky of Pitchfork gave it the publication's Best New Track designation and took note of the song's "characteristically sprawling arsenal—its symphonic slow-build, its sea of recorders, its climactic, singalong chorus". British GQs Jonathan Dean praised the song's "intense and building lament that packs in claustrophobia and beauty" and its "end stretch twinkling ambiance". In her review of The Ascension for NPR, Lindsay Zoladz called "America" "the best and most barbed song [Stevens has] released in the past five years".

Release history

References

External links

2020 singles
2020 songs
Asthmatic Kitty singles
Protest songs
Song recordings produced by Sufjan Stevens
Songs about the United States
Songs written by Sufjan Stevens
Sufjan Stevens songs